Casper Øyvann (born 7 December 1999) is a Norwegian football defender who plays for Tromsø IL.

A youth product of FK Bodø/Glimt, he made his senior debut in the 2018 Norwegian Football Cup, but never broke through and was loaned out to FK Mjølner in 2019. In 2020 he moved north to Tromsdalen UIL, and was picked up by their city rivals Tromsø IL in 2021. He made his Eliteserien debut in May 2021 against Bodø/Glimt.

A futsal player for Hulløy, Øyvann has been capped for the national futsal team.

References

1999 births
Living people
Sportspeople from Bodø
Norwegian footballers
FK Bodø/Glimt players
FK Mjølner players
Tromsdalen UIL players
Tromsø IL players
Eliteserien players
Association football defenders
Norwegian men's futsal players